The 1994 United States Senate election in Washington was held November 8, 1994. Incumbent Republican U.S. Senator Slade Gorton won re-election to a second consecutive term. , this was the last time the Republicans won a U.S. Senate election in Washington and the last time a male candidate won a U.S. Senate election in the state.

Background
Incumbent Slade Gorton was first elected U.S. Senator from Washington in 1980. Gorton narrowly lost his re-election bid in 1986. In 1988, Gorton successfully ran for the state's other Senate seat.

Leading up to the 1994 U.S. Senate elections, Gorton was considered one of the most vulnerable Republican incumbents. Democrats had swept the statewide elections in 1992—winning the presidential, gubernatorial, and U.S. Senate races.

Blanket primary

Democratic 
Many prominent Washington Democrats declined to contest the seat. Campaign analyst Charlie Cook of The Cook Political Report wrote that "the real top-notch folks just aren't running." Seattle mayor Norm Rice was encouraged by President Bill Clinton to run, but opted to stay in his position as mayor. The Democratic Senatorial Campaign Committee unsuccessfully urged members of the state's U.S. House delegation to run.

Ron Sims, King County Councilman, won the crowded Democratic primary with 18% of the vote. News anchor Mike James came in second with 15%; all other candidates received less than 5%.

Candidates

Declared
 Nominee: Ron Sims, member of King County Council
 Mike James, news anchor
 Scott Hardman, businessman
 Jesse Wineberry, member of the Washington House of Representatives

Declined
Booth Gardner, former Governor of Washington
Norm Rice, Mayor of Seattle
Norm Dicks, member of United States House of Representatives

Republican 
Incumbent Slade Gorton faced no serious competition for the Republican nomination. Gorton won the primary with 52% of the vote. No other Republican candidate received any significant amount of support.

Candidates
 Nominee: Slade Gorton, incumbent U.S. Senator
 Mike the Mover, perennial candidate
  Warren E. Hanson, commercial fisherman

Results

General election

Candidates 
 Ron Sims, member of King County Council
 Slade Gorton (R), incumbent U.S. Senator

Campaign 
Despite serving 12 years in the U.S. Senate, Gorton campaigned in 1994 as an outsider candidate. He told crowds at campaign rallies: "If you want more of what you're getting from Washington, D.C., send one of my opponents. If you want a different direction, give a voice to balance by sending me back to the Senate." He gained support among agricultural, logging, and mining groups in Eastern Washington for his criticism of federal regulations. Gorton called for opening up more federal forests to logging and changes to the Endangered Species Act.

Sims campaigned in support of the Clinton administration. He accused Gorton of obstructing President Clinton's healthcare and crime reforms. The Sims campaign also attempted to portray Gorton as out of touch with the average Washingtonian. Sims was the first African American U.S. Senate candidate in state history to advance to the general election, although the issue of race was rarely addressed during the campaign.

Results

See also 
 1994 United States Senate elections

References

External links 
 

1994
Washington
1994 Washington (state) elections